Errachidia (Berber language: Imetɣaren) is a province located in eastern central Morocco in the region of Dra-Tafilalt.

Errachidia is bordered by Algeria to the southeast and by the Moroccan provinces of Figig to the northeast, Midelt to the north, Tinghir to the west, and Zagura to the southwest. It is considered to be one of the most historically important regions of Morocco.

Errachidia, whose former name is Ksar Souk and Imetɣaren in the Berber language, was named Rachid, in tribute to one of the main founders of the Alaouite dynasty, the current Moroccan royal family.

Cities
 Aoufous
 Boudnib
 Erfoud
 Errachidia
 Goulmima
 Jorf
 Moulay Ali Cherif
 Rich
 Rissani
 Tinejdad

Subdivisions
The province is divided administratively into the following:

References

External links
 Site of the region Errachidia-Tafilalet

 
Errachidia Province